Vontobel Holding AG is a Swiss private banking and investment management group headquartered in Zurich. Established in 1924, as of August 2021, Vontobel has over 2,000 employees across 26 worldwide locations. Vontobel group's core businesses are Wealth Management, Asset Management and Digital Investing, catering to wealthy private clients as well as institutional investors. Among the top tier Swiss banks, Vontobel holds around $300 billion of client assets.

The registered shares of Vontobel Holding AG are listed on the SIX Swiss Exchange. The Vontobel families and the Vontobel Foundation hold the majority of shares. However, as a large listed company, it is led by an independent board of directors and executive committees.

Structure 
Vontobel comprises three business units: Wealth Management, Asset Management and Digital Investing.

History 
 1924
Friedrich Emil Haeberli establishes the brokerage firm Haeberli & Cie.

 1936
After Haeberli's death, Jakob Vontobel takes over the brokerage firm and establishes Bank J. Vontobel & Co.

 1943
Jakob Vontobel's son, Hans Vontobel, joins the bank and, in 1951, is made a partner with unlimited liability. In 1972, Jakob Vontobel's grandson, Hans-Dieter Vontobel, joins the bank and is made a partner with unlimited liability in 1977.

 1984
Bank J. Vontobel & Co is transformed into a limited liability corporation and the Group companies are combined within Vontobel Holding AG. The bearer shares of Vontobel Holding AG are listed on the Zurich Stock Exchange in 1986 and single-class registered shares are introduced in 2001.
Vontobel USA Inc. is founded in New York. This is followed by Vontobel Asset Management AG in 1988, Vontobel Bank & Trust Company Ltd in Grand Cayman and Vontobel Fonds Services AG in 1990, and Vontobel Fund Management SA in Luxembourg in 1991.

 1993
Vontobel acquires a stake in Banque Tardy, de Watteville & Cie SA, Geneva, followed by a majority stake in Bankhaus Berger & Comp. AG, Salzburg, in 1995. In 1996, Bankhaus Berger opens a branch in Vienna.

 1999
Vontobel Securities AG is established in Cologne. This is followed by Bank Vontobel (Liechtenstein) AG, Vaduz, in 2000 and Vontobel Luxembourg SA in 2001. In 2002, Bank Vontobel Österreich AG opens a branch in Munich. Vontobel Asset Management GmbH commences operations in Frankfurt am Main. Vontobel Asset Management SGR SpA is founded in Milan in 2003.

 2000
Bank J. Vontobel & Co AG is renamed Bank Vontobel AG. Banque Tardy, de Watteville & Cie SA now operates under the name Banque Vontobel Genève SA, and the former Bankhaus Berger is renamed Bank Vontobel Österreich AG. In 2002, Vontobel USA Inc. in New York is renamed Vontobel Asset Management, Inc.

 2001
The loss-making Internet banking project 'y-o-u Bank' is discontinued prior to completion and a loss of CHF 151 million is recorded.

 2004
Raiffeisen acquires a 12.5% stake in Vontobel Holding AG. The Vontobel family and the Vontobel Foundation continue to hold the majority of the company's share capital.

 2005
Vontobel Financial Products GmbH, Frankfurt am Main, is founded.

 2006
In January 2006, Vontobel acquires 56% of the share capital of Harcourt Investment Consulting AG from the Dutch firm NIBCapital N.V. Harcourt, which is domiciled in Zurich, is a leading provider of fund-of-hedge-funds and asset management mandates in the area of alternative investments for major institutional clients. The Vontobel Group launches transaction banking services for banks in Switzerland and Liechtenstein under the name VONSYS Vontobel Solutions for Your Sourcing. The Vontobel Group acquires the brokerage and corporate finance activities of Lombard Odier Darier Hentsch on 1 November 2006.

 2007
Vontobel opens a branch for its commission business in London. Its offering comprises brokerage services – particularly equity analysis and investment advice. The Vontobel Campus is established in the centre of Zurich's banking and financial district. Vontobel moves into its new head office at Gotthardstrasse 43, which was built by Stücheli Architekten and forms the heart of the new campus, in November 2007. Deutsche Börse AG and its partners Bank Vontobel, Bankhaus Metzler, Commerzbank AG, Deutsche Bank AG, DZ Bank AG and Umicore AG & Co. KG establish Deutsche Börse Commodities GmbH at the end of November 2007.

 2008
Vontobel Holding AG establishes a 100% subsidiary in the Dubai International Financial Centre (DIFC). Vontobel Financial Products Ltd. commences operations at the end of March 2008 and replaces Bank Vontobel Cayman as the issuing platform for structured products. The Vontobel Group establishes VT Wealth Management AG, an independent wealth management company for Swiss and international private clients. Vontobel holds a 51% stake in the new company and 49% is held by the management.

 2009
In May 2009, Bank Vontobel Europe AG, which is headquartered in Munich and is a 100% subsidiary of the Vontobel Group, commences operations in Germany after being granted a full banking license. In July 2009, the Vontobel Group acquires 100% of Commerzbank (Schweiz) AG, which is headquartered in Zurich and has a branch in Geneva and a subsidiary in Vienna. The integration of Commerzbank (Schweiz) results in a 20% increase in the volume of client assets held by the Vontobel Group's Private Banking business.

 2010
Branches of Bank Vontobel AG open in Basel and Berne. Vontobel Swiss Wealth Advisors AG is founded in Zurich.

 2012
Vontobel Financial Products (Asia Pacific) Pte. Ltd. is founded in Singapore and Vontobel Wealth Management (Hong Kong) Ltd. is founded in Hong Kong.

 2015
Vontobel announced it had acquired a 60 percent stake in Britain’s TwentyFour Asset Management, its first acquisition since Commerzbank in 2009.

 2016
Vontobel now has a branch (formerly Finter Bank) in Lugano.
Honorary President Dr. Hans J. Vontobel deceased at the age of 100.
Acquired Vescore

 2018

Merged multi-asset capabilities with Vescore

See also
 Twentyfour Income Fund, a large investment fund managed by Vontobel

References 

Financial services companies established in 1924
Companies listed on the SIX Swiss Exchange
Banks based in Zürich
Private banks
Swiss brands